Vítor is a Portuguese and Brazilian masculine given name, equivalent to Victor in English and Víctor in Spanish.

Footballers
 Vítor Gonçalves (footballer, born 1896) (1896–1965), Portuguese
 Vítor Silva (1909–1982), Portuguese
 Vítor Guilhar (born 1913), Portuguese
 Vítor Baptista (footballer, born 1920) (1920–2008), Portuguese
 Vítor Campos (1944–2019), Portuguese
 Vítor Gonçalves (footballer, born 1944), Portuguese 
 Vítor Damas (1947–2003), Portuguese
 Vítor Baptista (1948–1999), Portuguese
 Vítor Martins (footballer) (born 1950), Portuguese
 Vítor Oliveira (1953–2020), Portuguese
 Vitor (footballer, born 1953), Brazilian
 Vítor Paneira (born 1966), Portuguese
 Vítor Baía (born 1969), Portuguese
 Vítor (footballer, born 1972), Brazilian
 Vítor Pereira (footballer, born 1978), Portuguese
 Vítor Hugo (born 1981), Brazilian
 Vítor (footballer, born 1982), full name Cícero Vítor dos Santos Júnior, Brazilian football defender
 Vítor Silva (footballer, born 1982), Portuguese
 Vítor Silva (footballer, born 1984), Portuguese
 Vítor Vinha (born 1986), Portuguese
 Vítor (footballer, born 1987), full name Vitor Cruz de Jesus, Brazilian football defensive midfielder
 Vítor Gomes (born 1987), Portuguese
 Vítor Huvos (born 1988), Brazilian
 Vítor Bastos (born 1990), Portuguese
 Vítor Bruno (born 1990), Portuguese
 Vítor Saba (born 1990), Brazilian
 Vítor Gonçalves (footballer, born 1992), Portuguese
 Vítor São Bento (born 1992), Portuguese
 Vitor (footballer, born 1997), Brazilian
 Vitor Hugo (footballer, born 2004), Brazilian

Other sports
 Vitor Baptista (racing driver) (born 1998), Brazilian
 Vitor Belfort (born 1977), Brazilian mixed martial artist
 Vítor Benite (born 1990), Brazilian basketball player
 Vítor Faverani (born 1988), Brazilian basketball player
 Vítor Meira (born 1977), Brazilian auto racing driver who competed in IndyCar Series
 Vitor Miranda (born 1979), Brazilian kickboxer and mixed martial artist
 Vítor Ribeiro (born 1979), Brazilian mixed martial artist

Other professions
 Vítor Constâncio (born 1943), Portuguese economist
 Vítor Gonçalves (born 1951), Portuguese filmmaker
 Vítor Gonçalves (theatre director) (born 1963), Portuguese theatre director
 Vítor Martins (born 1944), Brazilian songwriter

Portuguese masculine given names